3C 215 is a Seyfert galaxy/Quasar located in the constellation Cancer.

References

External links
 www.jb.man.ac.uk/atlas/

Seyfert galaxies
Quasars
Cancer (constellation)
215
16.26
2817602